Pochaiv is a town in the Ternopil Oblast (province) of western Ukraine. It is located in the Kremenets Raion (district), and is located 18 km south-west of Kremenets and 70 km north of the oblast capital, Ternopil. Pochaiv hosts the administration of Pochaiv urban hromada, one of the hromadas of Ukraine. Population:

History 

It was a settlement in Kremenetsky Uyezd of the Volhynian Governorate of the Russian Empire.

During World War I in August 1915 it was controlled by Austro-Hungarian troops, although in summer 1916 it was occupied by Imperial Russian Army during Brusilov Offensive.

After Russian revolution of 1917 and Polish–Soviet War it was in Wołyń Voivodeship of interwar Poland.

Urban-type settlement since 1950s. Town since 1978.

In January 1989 the population was 10 019 people.

The city is known for the Pochayiv Lavra, the second largest Eastern Orthodox monastery in Ukraine.

On October 1, 2020, the Center for Provision of Social Services of the Pochaiv City Council was established, the head of which was appointed Gichka Yuriy Serhiyovych on the basis of competitive selection. :uk:%D0%9F%D0%BE%D1%87%D0%B0%D1%97%D0%B2%D1%81%D1%8C%D0%BA%D0%B0 %D0%BC%D1%96%D1%81%D1%8C%D0%BA%D0%B0 %D1%80%D0%B0%D0%B4%D0%B0#%D0%A6%D0%B5%D0%BD%D1%82%D1%80 %D0%BD%D0%B0%D0%B4%D0%B0%D0%BD%D0%BD%D1%8F %D1%81%D0%BE%D1%86%D1%96%D0%B0%D0%BB%D1%8C%D0%BD%D0%B8%D1%85 %D0%BF%D0%BE%D1%81%D0%BB%D1%83%D0%B3 %D0%9F%D0%BE%D1%87%D0%B0%D1%97%D0%B2%D1%81%D1%8C%D0%BA%D0%BE%D1%97 %D0%BC%D1%96%D1%81%D1%8C%D0%BA%D0%BE%D1%97 %D1%80%D0%B0%D0%B4%D0%B8 (%D0%A6%D0%9D%D0%A1%D0%9F)

Gallery

References

Cities in Ternopil Oblast
Cities of district significance in Ukraine